Henry Gerard Sturt, 1st Baron Alington (16 May 1825 – 17 February 1904), was a British peer, Conservative Party politician, and notorious slum landlord in the East End of London.

Early life
He was the son of Henry Sturt, a landowner and politician from Dorset. He matriculated at Christ Church, Oxford in 1843.

Political career
He was elected to Parliament in 1847 for Dorchester, and re-elected in 1852. In 1856, one of the Conservative MPs for the county of Dorset died. Sturt resigned his Dorchester seat and was elected to the vacant Dorset seat in a by-election. He was re-elected in 1857, 1859, 1865, 1868, and 1874. On 15 January 1876, he was created Baron Alington, of Crichel, and thereafter sat in the House of Lords as a Conservative peer.

Marriages and children
Sturt was twice married. On 10 September 1853, he wed his first cousin, Lady Augusta Bingham, daughter of George Bingham, 3rd Earl of Lucan and Lady Anne Brudenell. They had three children:

 Humphrey Napier Sturt, 2nd Baron Alington (1859–1919) (died of wounds).
 Winifred Selina Sturt (1868–1914).
 Mildred Cecilia Harriet Sturt (1869–1942), who married three times: to Henry Cadogan, Viscount Chelsea, in 1892; after his death, to Admiral Sir Hedworth Lambton in 1910; and after his death, to Charles William Augustus Montagu on 4 December 1930.

On 10 February 1892, Sturt wed Evelyn Henrietta Leigh.

East End landlord
Amongst other holdings, various branches of the family had owned land in London's East End for centuries and "Lord Alington, was still in possession of all but a small portion of the combined Pitfield estates in Hoxton when these were submitted to public auction in 1917".

Lord Alington was one of the private landlords specifically named in relation to the terrible conditions in the East End in the London Poverty Maps compiled by Charles Booth in the 1890s. "Some private landlords were also criticised. Infant mortality in Shoreditch, one investigator recorded, was 22 per 1000, much higher than the London average. Quoting an anonymous interviewee, he drew attention to the 'disgraceful meanness' of Lord Alington, who owned the whole parish and 'drew £20,000 from the neighbourhood'."

Notes

External links 
 
 

1825 births
1904 deaths
Barons Alington (third creation)
Sturt, Henry
Sturt, Henry
Sturt, Henry
Sturt, Henry
Sturt, Henry
Sturt, Henry
Sturt, Henry
Sturt, Henry
Sturt, Henry
Conservative Party (UK) hereditary peers
Peers of the United Kingdom created by Queen Victoria